"Don't Make Me Come Over There and Love You" is a song written by Jim Lauderdale and Carter Wood, and recorded by American country music artist George Strait. It was released in November 2000 as the second single from his self-titled album. The song reached #17 in the United States.

Background and writing
Jim Lauderdale told Taste of Country that the two writers were having dinner with Tim and Tracy Coates when they came up with the song. He said that once they came up with the title, the rest of the song came easily.

Music video
Strait released a music video in 2000 for the song which was directed by Gerry Wenner.

Chart positions

References

2000 singles
2000 songs
George Strait songs
Songs written by Jim Lauderdale
Song recordings produced by Tony Brown (record producer)
MCA Nashville Records singles